Defending champion Veronika Kudermetova and her partner Liudmila Samsonova defeated Chan Hao-ching and Latisha Chan in the final, 6–4, 6–7(4–7), [10–1] to win the women's doubles tennis title at the 2023 Dubai Tennis Championships.

Kudermetova and Elise Mertens were the reigning champions, but Mertens chose not to compete this year. 

This tournament marked the last professional appearance of former doubles world No. 1 Sania Mirza. Mirza partnered Madison Keys, but lost in the first round to Kudermetova and Samsonova.

Seeds
The top four seeds received a bye into the second round.

Draw

Finals

Top half

Bottom half

References

External links
Main draw

2023 WTA Tour
Doubles women